CMPP may stand for:
 Canadian Motion Picture Park Studios, one of the largest and newest film production centers in North America
 Centre for Multidisciplinary Postgraduate Programmes, a center of the NED University of Engineering and Technology (Karachi, Pakistan) to provide cheap educational and professional in training to existing professionals.
 Certified Medical Publication Professional, an international professional qualification awarded by the International Society for Medical Publication Professionals (ISMPP)
 Communication, Media & Public Policy, a Magnet program of Skyline High School (Michigan) in Michigan
 Millennium Bureau of Canada, which was a temporary agency of the Government of Canada, to celebrate the "millennium" during the year 2000
 Moroccan Centre for Clean Manufacturing, an Arab centre to promote entrepreneurship
 China Mobile Peer to Peer, a binary message protocol used by China Mobile for SMS communication